The 2017 New Mexico Bowl was a postseason college football bowl game played at Dreamstyle Stadium in Albuquerque, New Mexico on December 16, 2017. The game was the 12th edition of the New Mexico Bowl and featured the Marshall Thundering Herd of Conference USA and the Colorado State Rams of the Mountain West Conference. Sponsored by clothing company Gildan, the game was officially known as the 2017 Gildan New Mexico Bowl.

Teams
This game featured the Marshall Thundering Herd of Conference USA against the Colorado State Rams of the Mountain West Conference in their first meeting against each other.

Marshall Thundering Herd

The Marshall Thundering Herd finished the 2017 regular season with a 7–5 (4–4 C-USA) record. The game was the team's first appearance in the New Mexico Bowl and fourteenth overall. This was Marshall's first bowl game against a team from the Mountain West Conference since the 1999 Motor City Bowl win over BYU.

Colorado State Rams

The Colorado State Rams finished the 2017 regular season with a 7–5 (5–3 MW) record. The game was the team's third appearance in the New Mexico Bowl and seventeenth overall. The Rams had previously played in the 2013 game, winning against Washington State.

Game summary

Scoring summary

Source:

Statistics

Source:

References

2017–18 NCAA football bowl games
2017
2017 New Mexico Bowl
2017 New Mexico Bowl
December 2017 sports events in the United States
2017 in sports in New Mexico